Antena 2 may refer to:

Antena 2 (Romania), a Romanian TV channel
Antena 2 (Portugal), a Portuguese radio station

pt:Antena 2